John Vincent Calipari (born February 10, 1959) is an American basketball coach. Since 2009, he has been the head coach of the University of Kentucky men's team, with whom he won the NCAA Championship in 2012. He has been named Naismith College Coach of the Year three times (in 1996, 2008 and 2015), and was inducted into the Basketball Hall of Fame in 2015.

He was previously the head coach at the University of Massachusetts from 1988 to 1996, the NBA's New Jersey Nets from 1996 to 1999 and the University of Memphis from 2000 to 2009, and was the head coach of the Dominican Republic national team in 2011 and 2012.

Calipari has coached Kentucky to four Final Fours, in 2011, 2012, 2014 and 2015. He also led UMass and Memphis to the Final Four in 1996 and 2008 respectively; those appearances were later vacated, though Calipari was cleared of wrongdoing in both cases. As a college coach, Calipari has twenty-eight 20-win seasons, eleven 30-win seasons, and five 35-win seasons.

As of March 4th, 2023, with 789 official wins, Calipari ranks 14th on the NCAA Division I all-time winningest coaches list. He has won one national championship.

Early life
Calipari was born in Moon Township, Pennsylvania, a suburb of Pittsburgh. He is of Italian descent. He attended Moon Area High School and graduated in 1978. His father worked in a steel mill and later at an airport. His mother worked in the school cafeteria, serving pizza.

Playing career

Calipari lettered two years at UNC Wilmington before transferring to Clarion University of Pennsylvania, from which he graduated with a bachelor's degree in marketing. He played point guard at Clarion during the 1981 and 1982 seasons, leading the team in assists and free throw percentage.

Coaching career
From 1982 to 1985, Calipari was an assistant at the University of Kansas under Ted Owens and Larry Brown. Calipari had several jobs as the lowest coach in the pecking order when Ted Owens hired him as a volunteer assistant for the Jayhawks' 1982–83 season, including serving food at the training table. "I was blessed to have the chance. Can you imagine being 22, 23 and your first opportunity to be around the game is at a program like Kansas?"

From 1985 to 1988, he was an assistant coach at the University of Pittsburgh under Roy Chipman and Paul Evans. From 1988 to 1996, he was head coach at the University of Massachusetts. From 1996 to 1999, he was head coach and Executive VP of basketball operations for the NBA's New Jersey Nets. During the 1999–2000 season, he was an assistant coach for the Philadelphia 76ers under coach Larry Brown, before moving on to his next position at the University of Memphis.

Calipari is famous for popularizing the dribble drive motion offense, developed by Vance Walberg, which is sometimes known as the "Memphis Attack".

In his 22 official seasons (23 seasons overall) as a collegiate head coach, Calipari's record is 667–194 (.775). His record in the month of March is 107–37 (.743). His NCAA-adjusted (the records of two appearances being removed) official record in the NCAA tournament is 38–12 (.760), and in the NIT is 15–6 (.714). His teams have made 15 NCAA tournament appearances (13 officially, due to two later being vacated), including reaching the Sweet Sixteen 12 times (10 officially, due to two later being vacated), the Elite Eight 10 times (eight officially, due to two later being vacated), the Final Four six times (four officially, due to two later being vacated), the NCAA Championship Game three times (twice officially, with the 2008 Championship Game appearance while at Memphis being vacated by the NCAA), winning the NCAA Championship at Kentucky in 2012, and finishing NCAA Runner-Up in 2014.

As a college coach, Calipari has 21 20-win seasons (20 officially) and nine 30-win seasons (eight officially). He has also coached six teams to the NIT, winning the NIT Championship at Memphis in 2002. He is one of only four coaches in NCAA Division I history to direct three different schools to a #1 seed in the NCAA Tournament.

The platoon system established under John Calipari not only provided life for the University of Kentucky's basketball team in 2014, but it also provided an important defensive weapon. The platoon system was introduced in 2014, and consisted of playing 10 men in legions of five. Each platoon includes three ball-handlers and two taller players.

Since 2009, the Wildcats have been on the top of the high school basketball recruiting mountain. Recruiting has always been paramount for John Calipari and the Kentucky Wildcats. According to The Washington Post, Calipari's teams have been a defensive powerhouse, historically ranking in the top 50 in Ken Pomeroy's defensive debate. Because of his successful recruiting John Calipari is able to bring in elite talent, and does not have to use a mundane 2–3 zone, or man to man defensive tactics to gain a defensive edge. Due to the use of four seven foot front court players, Kentucky has had the ability to display their defensive shot blocking presence.

One notable statistic is that, from 2002 to 2018, all 25 players coached by Calipari who chose to enter the NBA draft after their first season were drafted in the first round. This streak started with Dajuan Wagner at the University of Memphis, and ended when Kentucky Wildcat Jarred Vanderbilt was not drafted until the second round.

University of Massachusetts
From 1988 to 1996 at UMass, Calipari led the Minutemen program to five consecutive Atlantic 10 titles and NCAA Tournament appearances, including periods where the program was ranked first nationally. He finished with a 193–71 record overall, with a 91–41 record in Atlantic 10 conference games. Calipari was named Atlantic 10 Coach of the Year in 1992, 1993, and 1996. He was also named the Naismith, NABC, Basketball Times & Sporting News National Coach of the Year in 1996. He led UMass to its first-ever appearance in the Final Four with the play of the John R. Wooden Award winner and Naismith College Player of the Year Marcus Camby, although this appearance was later vacated by the NCAA because Camby had accepted about $28,000 worth of gifts, in particular a gold chain, from two sports agents who were luring him to enter the NBA draft after his Sophomore season.

Calipari helped accelerate the construction of the Mullins Center, UMass' basketball and hockey facility. He also reached out to eastern Massachusetts and Boston to enlarge the fan base. Before moving on to the New Jersey Nets, Calipari became the second winningest coach in UMass history behind Jack Leaman.

In 2010, then-ESPN.com writer Pat Forde, in his "Forde Minutes" column, said of the 1992 team:

In the Sweet 16 matchup with Kentucky in 1992, official Lenny Wirtz issued Calipari a controversial technical foul for being outside the coach's box during a crucial UMass possession. Kentucky went on to face Duke in the next round in one of the greatest games in college basketball history, won on a last-second shot by Christian Laettner.

In 1993, UMass defeated defending NCAA champion and preseason #1 North Carolina in the pre-season NIT in Madison Square Garden. The following year #3 UMass defeated defending NCAA champion and #1 Arkansas in the Hall of Fame Tip-Off classic, which resulted in UMass becoming the first New England college basketball team to be voted #1 in the Associated Press poll.

During Calipari's tenure at UMass, the program became one of the most dominant in college basketball despite recruiting just one McDonald's All-American (Donta Bright) and having only two players drafted by an NBA team (Lou Roe and Marcus Camby). Forde recalled the Final Four team in Calipari's final UMass season in 1995–96 as a squad "with one superstar (Marcus Camby) and a collection of complementary parts". By winning both the Atlantic 10 regular season and conference tournament championships from 1992 to 1996, UMass became the second team in college basketball history to win 5 consecutive regular season and conference tournament championships (NC State was the first).

New Jersey Nets and Philadelphia 76ers
In the 1996–97 season, John Calipari replaced Butch Beard as head coach of the New Jersey Nets. After a 26–56 debut season, the Nets made a major draft-day trade in June 1997, acquiring Keith Van Horn, Lucious Harris and two other players in exchange for Tim Thomas.

In 1997, while coaching the New Jersey Nets, Calipari directed profanities at Star-Ledger sports reporter Dan Garcia and referred to him as a "Mexican idiot". Garcia sued for $5,000,000 for emotional distress. Though the case was dismissed and Calipari apologized for his remarks, he was still fined $25,000 by the NBA.

The 1997–98 season was a lone bright spot for the Nets in the late 1990s. The team played well under Calipari, winning 43 games and qualifying for the playoffs on the last day of the season. The Nets were seeded eighth in the Eastern Conference and lost to the Chicago Bulls in the 1998 playoffs in three straight games.

The 1998–99 season was delayed for three months due to an owners' lockout of the players. When the abbreviated 50-game season began, the Nets were a choice by experts as a surprise team. However, Sam Cassell was injured in the first game and the team started poorly. With the Nets underachieving at 3–15, the Nets traded Cassell to the Milwaukee Bucks, while the Nets acquired Stephon Marbury from the Minnesota Timberwolves. After two more losses, Calipari was fired as head coach with the team at 3–17. He finished his tenure with an overall record of 72 wins and 112 losses and a .391 overall winning percentage. He then joined Larry Brown as an assistant coach for the Philadelphia 76ers.

University of Memphis

Calipari became head coach at the University of Memphis in 2000. In Calipari's first nine years as head coach at Memphis, he won 214 games (38 wins were vacated) and posted seven consecutive 20-win seasons, plus one more in his final season (including an NCAA record four consecutive 30-win seasons, though the third season was vacated and this record no longer holds). He also earned seven consecutive postseason bids (plus one in his final season). His 2007–2008 team's 38 victories set a new NCAA Division I Men's Basketball record for most victories in a season, a record that now belongs to the 2011–2012 Kentucky Wildcats due to NCAA violations that vacated all of Memphis' wins. The nine consecutive 20-win seasons and the nine consecutive postseason appearances would have been the most in school history, though that officially stands now at seven because of the vacated 2007–08 season. He was named Conference USA Coach of the Year in 2006, 2008, and 2009. In 2008, he was named Naismith College Coach of the Year, receiving the honor for the second time. In 2009, he was named Sports Illustrated College Basketball Coach of the Year.

He built a national program by recruiting blue chip players from the Eastern part of the country, such as Dajuan Wagner from Camden (NJ), Darius Washington Jr. from Orlando (FL), Rodney Carney from Indianapolis (IN), Shawne Williams from Memphis (TN), Joey Dorsey from Baltimore (MD), Chris Douglas-Roberts from Detroit (MI), Antonio Anderson from Lynn (MA), Robert Dozier from Lithonia (GA), Derrick Rose from Chicago (IL), and Tyreke Evans from Aston (PA).

While at Memphis, Calipari popularized the dribble drive motion offense that was invented by former Pepperdine basketball coach Vance Walberg.

On January 21, 2008, Calipari led the Tigers to the No. 1 ranking in the AP Poll for only the second time in school history.

In 2006 and 2008, Memphis earned a No. 1 seed in the NCAA men's basketball tournament. In 2008, Calipari's Tigers advanced to the national championship game, their first under his leadership. They also won 38 games, the most regular-season wins in NCAA history (his 2011–12 Kentucky team would also go on to win 38 games). His team, however, would lose to the Kansas Jayhawks, 75–68, in overtime. This team later had its entire season record vacated by the NCAA because the Educational Testing Service (ETS), which administers the SAT college admissions test, invalidated Derrick Rose's score on that test. Despite this, Rose still denies any wrongdoing. The NCAA began to investigate the test and contacted the ETS. Because the NCAA had begun to investigate, ETS decided to review the test. The ETS sent three letters to Rose's family's former address in Chicago (instead of his dorm in Memphis) to ask that Rose verify some information on his test. Because he did not reply to the letters, ETS invalidated his SAT. This happened even though the NCAA investigated and reported that they could not find significant evidence to prove that Rose did not take the test. Because the ETS had invalidated the test, the NCAA retroactively declared Rose ineligible. To this day, the official position of the NCAA is that Rose did take his own SAT. If not for the vacated wins, Calipari would be the winningest coach in Tigers history, as he would have 252 wins to Larry Finch's 220.

On May 28, 2010, John Calipari, Derrick Rose, and University of Memphis athletic director R.C. Johnson reached a $100,000 out-of-court settlement with three attorneys who represented Memphis season ticket holders and threatened a lawsuit over the vacated 2007–08 season. Also as part of the settlement, Calipari donated his near-$232,000 bonus to the Memphis scholarship fund.

University of Kentucky

On March 30, 2009, four days after Memphis' season ending loss to Missouri in the NCAA tournament, multiple sources reported that Calipari would agree to be the head coach at the University of Kentucky, after UK's head coach, Billy Gillispie, was fired after two unsuccessful seasons at the school. Calipari rejected a counter offer by Memphis for Kentucky's 8 year, $31.65 million contract.

According to university officials, John Calipari signed a written contract on March 31, 2009. The contract was worth $34.65 million over 8 years, plus incentives. On April 1, 2009, the University of Kentucky Director of Athletics, Mitch Barnhart, formally introduced John Calipari as the new coach of the University of Kentucky Wildcats. During the press conference, Calipari spoke at length about his relationships with former UK basketball players and coaches, and also in his difficulties in accepting the UK job, largely due to his deep emotional ties with both the city of Memphis and University of Memphis. Calipari stated, "Coming to UK was the easy part, it was leaving the city of Memphis that was the hard part." He went on to refer to the University of Kentucky coaching position as his "dream job". Calipari became the 22nd coach overall at Kentucky, and just the 7th coach in the last 79 years for the Wildcats.

2009–10

In his first year as head coach, Calipari had a highly touted recruiting class, including the No. 1 overall rated recruit, John Wall, plus fellow 5-star recruits, DeMarcus Cousins, Eric Bledsoe, and Daniel Orton. On December 21, 2009, Calipari led the Cats to their 12th victory of the season and the program's 2,000th victory ever. Kentucky won its 44th SEC Regular Season Championship in 2009–10, with a 14–2 conference record. Calipari's team followed this up with the UK's 26th SEC Tournament Championship, with an overtime defeat of Mississippi State, 75–74, in the SEC Tournament title game. In the NCAA Tournament, however, No. 1 seed Kentucky (East Region) was upset by West Virginia in the Elite 8, to finish the season at 35–3.

2010–11

In his second season at Kentucky, Calipari recruited the No. 1 rated point guard in the 2010 class, Brandon Knight. In addition to Knight, Calipari also signed two other 5-star recruits, Terrence Jones and Doron Lamb. In 2010–11, Kentucky finished the regular season with a record of 22–8, with a 10–6 record in SEC regular season play. UK would go on to win its second consecutive SEC Tournament Championship, defeating Florida, 70–54, in the SEC Tournament title game. As a result, Kentucky received a No. 4 seed in the NCAA Tournament (East Regional). During the NCAA Tournament, Kentucky would go on to defeat No. 1 overall seed Ohio State, 62–60, in the Sweet-16. In the Elite Eight, Calipari's team would avenge an early season loss to North Carolina, by defeating the Tar Heels, 76–69, securing Kentucky's first Final Four appearance since 1998. In the Final Four, UK fell to the eventual NCAA Champions, UConn, by one point, 56–55, finishing with a final record of 29–9.

2011–12

In this third season, Kentucky landed another No. 1 recruiting class with four consensus five star players: Anthony Davis, Marquis Teague, Michael Kidd-Gilchrist and Kyle Wiltjer. Kentucky came into the season ranked #2 in the country. They finished the regular season with a 30–1 record, their only loss to Indiana by a buzzer-beater and went 16–0 in conference play. In the SEC tournament, Kentucky lost in the championship game to Vanderbilt 71–64. In the NCAA Tournament, Calipari's team was selected as the overall #1 seed in the tournament, representing as the South Region #1 seed. Kentucky avenged the early season loss to Indiana beating them in the Sweet Sixteen 102–90, and knocked off Baylor in the Elite Eight 82–70, to advance to their second consecutive Final Four. In the Final Four in New Orleans, Kentucky first faced their in-state rival, the Louisville Cardinals and Rick Pitino, winning 69–61. Two days later, in the National Championship game, Kentucky played in another early season rematch against the Kansas Jayhawks, winning a hard-fought contest 67–59. The win secured Calipari his first NCAA Championship, an NCAA record 38-win season, and the 8th overall NCAA Championship for Kentucky. By doing so, John Calipari became the 5th head coach to win an NCAA Championship at Kentucky (an NCAA record), and the first coach to do so at the school since Tubby Smith in 1998.

Following the 2012 championship, UK Athletics Director Mitch Barnhart announced on May 4 that Calipari's contract had been renegotiated. Under the new contract, Calipari will make up to $8.0 million annually (not including bonuses), which further cements his status as one of the most highly compensated college basketball coaches in the country. Mike Krzyzewski, coach of the Duke University team, leads the NCAA at an annual salary of $9.8 million.

In April 2019, Calipari agreed to a "lifetime" contract with Kentucky, centered on a 10-year coaching extension, and a lifetime paid ambassadorship when he retires.

College statistics

|-
| style="text-align:left;"| 1978–79
| style="text-align:left;"| UNC Wilmington
| 25
| N/A
| N/A
| .235
| N/A
| .840
| 0.3
| 0.9
| 0.0
| 0.0
| 1.2
|-
| style="text-align:left;"| 1980–81
| style="text-align:left;"| Clarion
| 19
| N/A
| N/A
| .457
| N/A
| .615
| 0.9
| 2.6
| 0.9
| 0.0
| 3.1
|-
| style="text-align:left;"| 1981–82
| style="text-align:left;"| Clarion
| 27
| N/A
| N/A
| .387
| N/A
| .717
| 1.0
| 5.3
| 1.3
| 0.1
| 5.3

Head coaching record

College

 ^abc UMass had its 4–1 record in the 1996 NCAA tournament and Final Four standing vacated after Marcus Camby was ruled ineligible due to his contact with a sports agent.

 ^abcdef The NCAA vacated 38 wins and 1 loss from Memphis's 2007–08 season under Calipari due to violations of NCAA rules.

 ^ Under current NCAA official records, Calipari's record as of March 7, 2020 is 733–215 (.773), which accounts for the 4 vacated wins (and one vacated loss) in the 1995–96 NCAA Tournament at UMass, and the 38 vacated wins (and 1 vacated losses) at Memphis in the entire 2007–08 season.

Calipari's actual on-the-court record without vacated games is

NBA

|-
| align="left" |New Jersey
| align="left" |
| 82||26||56||.317|| align="center" |5th in Atlantic||—||—||—||—
| align="center" |Missed Playoffs
|-
| align="left" |New Jersey
| align="left" |
| 82||43||39||.524|| align="center" |3rd in Atlantic||3||0||3||.000
| align="center" |Lost in first round
|-
| align="left" |New Jersey
| align="left" |
| 20||3||17||.150|| align="center" |7th in Atlantic||—||—||—||—
| align="center" |Fired
|-
|-class="sortbottom"
| style="text-align:left;"|Career
| ||184||72||112||.391|| ||3||0||3||.000

Overall wins
On February 26, 2011, after Kentucky beat the Florida Gators in Rupp Arena, Calipari was recognized for his 500th career victory as a Division I men's basketball coach. Over the course of the next few months, the NCAA's Committee on Infractions (COI) and the University of Kentucky exchanged letters debating whether Calipari had indeed reached the 500-win milestone. Due to games vacated by the NCAA in two different seasons (the 1996 season at UMass and the 2008 season at Memphis), the NCAA only officially recognized Calipari's 500th all time coaching victory on March 15, 2012.

Coaching tree
Assistant coaches under Calipari who became NCAA or NBA head coaches
Bill Bayno-UNLV (1995–2000)
Bruiser Flint-UMass (1996–2001), Drexel (2001–2016)
Derek Kellogg-UMass (2008–2017), LIU (2017–2022)
Chuck Martin-Marist (2008–2013)
Josh Pastner-Memphis (2009–2016), Georgia Tech (2016–present)
Orlando Antigua-South Florida (2014–2017)
Tony Barbee-Central Michigan (2021–present)
Kenny Payne-Louisville (2022–present)
Rod Strickland-LIU (2022–present)

Awards and honors
Calipari was inducted into the National Italian American Sports Hall of Fame in 2004.

On September 11, 2015, he was inducted into the Naismith Memorial Basketball Hall of Fame. As of the 2015–2016 NCAA Division I college basketball season, John Calipari is one of only 6 active coaches enshrined.

On September 21, 2021, the main basketball court at Clarion University's Tippin Gymnasium was officially renamed "Coach Cal Court."

Books
He has written several books, including Bounce Back: Overcoming Setbacks to Succeed in Business and in Life (2009) and Players First: Coaching from the Inside Out (2014). Additionally, Calipari starred in the 30 for 30 documentary from ESPN "One and Not Done" which details his professional career.

Personal life
Calipari, who has dual citizenship in the U.S. and Italy, has been married to his wife Ellen since 1986. They have two daughters, Erin, a neuropharmacologist who played basketball at UMass, and Megan, a French pastry chef, and a son Brad, who played basketball at Kentucky for two seasons. Brad graduated from Kentucky in May 2019 with two remaining seasons of college eligibility, and chose to transfer to the University of Detroit Mercy (UDM) to complete his college playing career. After playing two seasons at UDM and receiving a master's degree in 2021, Brad chose not to take advantage of the extra season of athletic eligibility offered to all NCAA basketball players in the wake of COVID-19 and joined the UK coaching staff as a graduate assistant. His second cousin is TJ Friedl, a baseball player.

Calipari appeared at Governor Andy Beshear's July 9, 2020 press briefing to publicly state his support of the Kentucky statewide mask mandate due to the COVID-19 pandemic in Kentucky stating: "We in our state have done an unbelievable job," Calipari said. "Let's take it up a notch. This is kind of like what I'm coaching: We're winning, and I'm being even harder. We are winning, let's be stronger." He made it clear that he volunteered to appear and the Governor did not request his appearance.

Confrontation with John Chaney
On February 13, 1994, Temple University basketball coach John Chaney threatened to kill Calipari at a post-game news conference, while Calipari was speaking at a podium. Chaney entered the conference mid-speech, called him an "Italian son of a bitch," accusing Calipari of manipulating the referees. When Calipari attempted to respond to the accusations, Chaney yelled, "Shut up goddammit!", and proceeded to charge the stage, before being stopped by security. While being held back, Chaney shouted, "When I see you, I'm gonna kick your ass!" As security restrained Chaney, he repeatedly yelled, "I'll kill you!" and angrily admitted telling his players to "knock your fucking kids in the mouth." Chaney received a one-game suspension for the incident. Chaney apologized a few days later and they eventually reconciled and would later become friends, occasionally posing for pictures pretending to fight for fans.

See also
 List of college men's basketball coaches with 600 wins
 List of NCAA Division I Men's Final Four appearances by coach

References

External links
 
 Kentucky profile

1959 births
Living people
American men's basketball coaches
American men's basketball players
Basketball coaches from Pennsylvania
Basketball players from Pittsburgh
Clarion Golden Eagles men's basketball players
College men's basketball head coaches in the United States
Kansas Jayhawks men's basketball coaches
Kentucky Wildcats men's basketball coaches
Memphis Tigers men's basketball coaches
New Jersey Nets head coaches
People from Franklin Lakes, New Jersey
Philadelphia 76ers assistant coaches
Pittsburgh Panthers men's basketball coaches
Point guards
Sportspeople from Pittsburgh
UMass Minutemen basketball coaches
UNC Wilmington Seahawks men's basketball players